Fritz Auer (born 24 June 1933 in Tübingen, Germany), is a German architect, the founder and senior partner of Auer+Weber+Assoziierte.

Career
 1953–1962    studied at TH Stuttgart (Stuttgart University)
 1958–1959    Scholarship to Cranbrook Academy of Arts, Bloomfield Hill, Michigan, USA, Master of Architecture
 1962          graduated from TH Stuttgart
 1960–1965    Behnisch and Lambart, Stuttgart
 1965          Yamasaki+Associates, Birmingham, Michigan, USA
 1966–1979    Partner in Behnisch & Partner, and designed Olympiapark in Munich
 since 1980    Office Auer+Weber with Carlo Weber
 1985–1992    Professor of Munich University of Applied Sciences
 1993–2001    Professor of Staatliche Akademie der Bildenden Künste Stuttgart
 since 1993    Member of Academy of Arts, Berlin

See also
 Auer+Weber+Assoziierte

External links 
Auer+Weber+Assoziierte
 

1933 births
Living people
20th-century German architects
Members of the Academy of Arts, Berlin
Auer+Weber+Assoziierte
Academic staff of the Munich University of Applied Sciences
University of Stuttgart alumni
People from Baden-Württemberg